Talmage is an unincorporated community in Jones Township, Union County, Iowa, United States.

History
Founded in the 1800s, Talmage's population was 42 in 1902, and 79 in 1925.

References

Unincorporated communities in Union County, Iowa
Unincorporated communities in Iowa